Gwintinli (also known as Guntingli) is a populated place in Ghana. It is about 151 m above sea level.

References

Populated places in Ghana